Hugh Carr is a former Irish nationalist politician.

Carr was elected to Newry and Mourne District Council in 1989, representing the Social Democratic and Labour Party in Crotlieve.

Carr was elected to the Northern Ireland Forum in 1996, representing South Down, but was not able to take the same seat at the 1998 Northern Ireland Assembly election.

Carr held his council seat at the 1993, 1997 and 2001 elections. In 2003, he was appointed as the Chair of the Newry District Policing Partnership. However, he resigned from the council in April, citing personal circumstances.

References

Living people
Members of Newry and Mourne District Council
Social Democratic and Labour Party councillors
Members of the Northern Ireland Forum
Social Democratic and Labour Party politicians
Year of birth missing (living people)